New York Mutual Life Insurance Company Building, also known as the Victory Building, is a historic office building located in the Market East neighborhood of Philadelphia, Pennsylvania. Henry Fernbach and Phillip W. Roos are credited as the building's architects. It was built in 1873, and is a seven-story, brick building, faced with granite, and measuring 58 feet by 176 feet. Its three lowest stories feature engaged columns, pilasters, balustrades, and arcades. The top three stories were added in 1890–1891. It is topped by a mansard roof in the Second Empire style.

It was added to the National Register of Historic Places in 1980. It is located on the East Center City Commercial Historic District.

References

External links
 
 

Historic American Buildings Survey in Philadelphia
Commercial buildings on the National Register of Historic Places in Philadelphia
Second Empire architecture in Pennsylvania
Commercial buildings completed in 1891
Market East, Philadelphia